Lílian Lemmertz Dias (Porto Alegre, June 15, 1937 – Rio de Janeiro, June 5, 1986) was a Brazilian actress.

Biography 
Of German descent, Lemmertz graduated as a teacher of Literature in Porto Alegre. Her acting career began when Antonio Abujamra, a course colleague and family friend, convinced her to work in the play The Glass Life, which was being assembled by the University Theatre of the state capital.

She was married to Lineu Dias and is mother of actress Júlia Lemmertz. She died on June 5, 1986, in Rio de Janeiro.

References

External links 

1937 births
1986 deaths
Brazilian television actresses
Brazilian telenovela actresses
Brazilian film actresses
Brazilian stage actresses
Brazilian people of German descent
20th-century Brazilian actresses